Hotseat or hot seat is a multiplayer mode provided by some turn-based video games, which allows two or more players to play on the same device by taking turns playing the game. The term was first used as a reference to playing a PC game and trading seats with the other player, but the mode dates back to early 1980s arcade games. A notable example of games that use this mode is the Heroes of Might and Magic series, which allows up to 8 players to play locally on the same computer.

Hotseat multiplayer has also seen prominence on some console video games, especially certain multiplayer games that are intended to be family-friendly, within the party genre, or both.  For example, the Wii games Wii Sports and Wii Sports Resort have certain sports, such as golf, that require its competitors to take turns.  Players share a Wii Remote, the system's controller, which the current player has possession of during a turn.

Hotseat play allows players to play a multiplayer game with only one copy of the game on only one device.  Since hotseat play is usually defined as turn-based by nature, the duration of a game may extend beyond that of a comparable real-time networked multiplayer game where each player can take action at the same time. Some games allow hotseat and networked players to compete with each other in the same game, while maintaining turn-based play. In those cases, hotseat enables  players to play on fewer than  physical computers.

See also
 Play-by-mail game
 Split screen gaming

References

Video game gameplay
Esports terminology